Falklands Conservation (FC) is a charitable organisation formed to protect the wildlife and the natural environment of the Falkland Islands in the South Atlantic Ocean.  It intends to conserve and undertake scientific research in the biosphere of the Falkland Islands and publish the results of the research to inform the public in the field of nature conservation. They also intend to preserve the Falkland Islands heritage and carry out other charitable activities.

History
The origins of FC go back to 1979 when a group of naturalists, including Peter Scott, established a UK registered charity, the Falkland Islands Foundation (FIF), to protect the wildlife of the Falklands and its historic shipwrecks.  In 1980 another body, the Falkland Islands Trust (FIT) was formed in the Islands.

In 1982, following the Falklands War, FIF became a membership-based organisation.  With the merger of FIT and FIF in 1991, it was formally launched on 1 August by David Attenborough as Falklands Conservation.

Falklands Conservation has a partnership with BirdLife International, representing the Falkland Islands, and a member of the International Union for Conservation of Nature.

References

Notes

Sources

External links
 Falklands Conservation

Environment of the Falkland Islands
Bird conservation organizations
Environmental organizations based in the Falkland Islands
Animal welfare organisations based in the Falkland Islands
Organizations established in 1979